Peter van Agtmaal (born 25 January 1982 in Huijbergen) is a Dutch former professional cyclist.

Major results

2000
 1st  Time trial, National Junior Road Championships
2002
 1st Omloop van het Waasland
 1st Memorial Philippe Van Coningsloo
2003
 Tour du Faso
1st Stages 5 & 9
2004
 1st PWZ Zuidenveld Tour
 1st Stage 1 Tour du Sénégal
 3rd Schaal Sels
2005
 Tour d'Indonesia
1st Stages 4, 5 & 7
2006
 2nd Overall Tour de Gironde
1st Stage 3
2007
 1st Overall Grand Prix Chantal Biya
1st Stage 1
2008
 1st Stage 2 Tour of Romania
2009
 1st Overall Grand Prix Chantal Biya
1st Stage 1
2010
 1st Stage 1 Tour du Faso

References

External links

1982 births
Living people
Dutch male cyclists
People from Woensdrecht
20th-century Dutch people
21st-century Dutch people
Cyclists from North Brabant